The 2nd Foreign Cavalry Regiment was a cavalry regiment of the Foreign Legion in the French Army. the regiment was dissolved twice in 1946 and 1962; the regimental colors have been entrusted by the Foreign Legion Detachment in Mayotte since 1984.  


History

2nd Foreign Cavalry Regiment since 1939 

The 2nd Foreign Cavalry Regiment (2e R.E.C) was created in July 1939 on the substance of the squadron groups of Morocco issued from the 1st Foreign Cavalry Regiment 1er REC.

World War II 

At the outbreak of World War II, the 2nd Foreign Cavalry Regiment was stationed in Morocco and part of it were quickly attached to the 97th Reconnaissance Group of the Infantry Division, (G.R.D 97) which engaged in combat in France during the German spring offensive of 1940, and which the commander, Lieutenant-Colonel Boyer de Latour, was killed leading at the bois de Noroy the 9th of July of the same year. Following the armistice, the regiment was dissolved on November 15, 1940 and the regimental colours were entrusted to the honor guard of the 1st Foreign Cavalry Regiment.

Indochina 

The 2nd Foreign Cavalry Regiment was officially dissolved on June 1, 1946 at Sidi Bel Abbès, however, the regiment was recreated in November of the same year, garrisoned at Oujda, where the regiment would remain until 1956. The mission of the regiment was to instruct and train reinforcements destined for the 1st Foreign Cavalry Regiment in the Far East.

North Africa and Algerian War 

Following the Paris accords in 1954 and the departure for Indochina in 1955, the 2nd Foreign Cavalry Regiment participated to the securing of Moroccan territories then, starting from 1956 to the missions of maintaining order in Algeria, first in the sector of Laghouat, then, starting from 1958, along the Tunisian border. In January 1962, the 2nd Foreign Cavalry Regiment made way on Biskra before being dissolved again following the Evian accords.

In 5 years of campaigning in Algeria, the 2nd Foreign Cavalry Regiment eliminated more than 1022 rebels and captured 697 arms, of which 30 machine guns. The 2nd Squadron (2e Esc) was attached to the 1st Foreign Parachute Regiment when deployed to take part in the operations of the Suez Canal Crisis.

Foreign Legion Detachment in Mayotte 

In 1984, the Foreign Legion Detachment in Mayotte received the honor guard regimental colors of the 2nd Foreign Cavalry Regiment.

Traditions

Insignias

Regimental Colours 

Regimental Colours of the 2nd Foreign Cavalry Regiment were entrusted to the Foreign Legion Detachment in Mayotte in 1984.

Decorations 

Decorations of the 2nd Foreign Cavalry Regiment with cited decorations of the Foreign Legion Detachment in Mayotte as of 1984.

Honours

Battle honours

As inscribed on the regimental colors of the 2nd Foreign Cavalry Regiment:

Camerone 1863
AFN 1952–1962

Regimental Commanders

See also 

 Major (France)
 French Foreign Legion Music Band (MLE)
 Paul Gardy
 René Lennuyeux
 1st Mounted Saharan Squadron of the Foreign Legion
 Armored Train of the Foreign Legion
 Passage Company of the Foreign Legion
 5th Heavy Weight Transport Company

References

External links 
 2e REC – History & images of the 2e REC

Defunct French Foreign Legion units
Military units and formations established in 1939
Military units and formations disestablished in 1946
Military units and formations established in 1946
Military units and formations disestablished in 1962